McGuinness (also MacGuinness, McGinnis, Guinness) is an Irish surname. It derives from and is an anglicized form of the Gaelic Mac Aonghuis, literally meaning "son of Angus" (Angus meaning "one, choice"). It may also denote the name Mac Naois. 

People with the surname include: 

 Albert McGuinness, Australian rugby league footballer of the 1930s and 1940s
 Arthur Guinness (1725–1803), Irish brewer and founder
 Bobby McGuinness (born 1954), Scottish footballer
 Brian McGuinness (1927–2019), British philosopher
 Catherine McGuinness (English politician), City of London Corporation
 Catherine McGuinness (judge) (born 1934), Irish Supreme Court judge, former senator
 Charles McGuinness (1893–1947), Irish adventurer, author, and sailor
 Deborah McGuinness (born c. 1960), American computer scientist working in the field of artificial intelligence
 Ed McGuinness, American comic book artist and penciller
 Edwin D. McGuinness (1856–1901), American politician, mayor of Providence, Rhode Island
 Eugene McGuinness  (born 1985), British singer-songwriter
 Frank McGuinness (born 1953), Irish playwright, translator and poet
 Georgina McGuinness (née Allen), television journalist from Adelaide
 Gerry McGuinness (born 1953), Scottish rugby union player
 Jim McGuinness (born 1972), Gaelic footballer and manager
 John McGuinness (born 1972), English professional motorcycle racer
 John J. McGuinness (born 1955), Irish Fianna Fáil politician and TD for Carlow-Kilkenny since 1997
 Mairead McGuinness (born 1959), Irish Fine Gael politician and MEP since 2004
 Martin McGuinness (1950–2017), Irish Sinn Féin politician and Deputy First Minister of Northern Ireland, 2007–2017
 Nathan McGuinness, visual effects supervisor
 Nigel McGuinness (born 1976), English professional wrestler
 Norah McGuinness (1901–1980), Irish painter and illustrator
 Paddy McGuinness (born 1973), English comedian
 Paddy McGuinness (civil servant), intelligence officer
 Padraic McGuinness (1938–2008), Australian journalist
 Paul McGuinness (born 1951), manager of Irish rock band U2
 Paul "Mad Dog" McGuinness, Irish guitarist and vocalist with the band Shane MacGowan and The Popes
 Rosamond McGuinness, (1929–2012), music historian
 Séamus McGuinness (1930–2008), Gaelic footballer
 Seán McGuinness (died 1978), Irish Republican, TD for Leix-Offaly 1923–1925
 Wilf McGuinness (born 1937), English football player and manager

See also
Other people with similar names:
 Alban Maginness (born 1950), Irish SDLP politician
 James Anthony McGuiness (with a single n), birth name of James Anthony Bailey
 Jay McGuiness (with a single n), member of boy band The Wanted

Similar names:
 Magennis
 McGinnis

Other:
 McGuinness Boulevard, roadway
 McGuinness Flint, band
 McGuinness Institute, institute

Surnames of Irish origin
Anglicised Irish-language surnames
Ulaid
Patronymic surnames
Surnames from given names